

Ya 

 Val Yacula b. 1908 first elected in 1958 as Progressive Conservative member for Springfield, Manitoba.
 Antonio Yanakis b. 1922 first elected in 1965 as Liberal member for Berthier—Maskinongé—delanaudière, Quebec.

Ye 

 Lynne Yelich b. 1953 first elected in 2000 as Canadian Alliance member for Blackstrap, Saskatchewan.
 James Yeo b. 1832 first elected in 1873 as Liberal member for Prince County, Prince Edward Island.
 John Yeo b. 1837 first elected in 1896 as Liberal member for East Prince, Prince Edward Island.
 Paul Yewchuk b. 1937 first elected in 1968 as Progressive Conservative member for Athabaska, Alberta.

Yi
Jean Yip b. 1968 first elected in 2017 as Liberal member for Scarborough—Agincourt, Ontario.

Yo 

 Alexander MacGillivray Young b. 1878 first elected in 1925 as Liberal member for Saskatoon, Saskatchewan.
 Edward James Young b. 1878 first elected in 1925 as Liberal member for Weyburn, Saskatchewan.
 James Young b. 1835 first elected in 1867 as Liberal member for Waterloo South, Ontario.
 John Young b. 1811 first elected in 1872 as Liberal member for Montreal West, Quebec.
 Kate Young first elected in 2015 as Liberal member for London West, Ontario. 
 M. Douglas Young b. 1940 first elected in 1988 as Liberal member for Gloucester, New Brunswick.
 Neil Young b. 1936 first elected in 1980 as New Democratic Party member for Beaches, Ontario.
 Newton Manly Young b. 1892 first elected in 1926 as Conservative member for Toronto Northeast, Ontario.
 Rodney Young b. 1910 first elected in 1948 as Cooperative Commonwealth Federation member for Vancouver Centre, British Columbia.
 Roger Carl Young b. 1941 first elected in 1974 as Liberal member for Niagara Falls, Ontario.
 Terence Young b. 1952 first elected in 2008 as Conservative member for Oakville, Ontario. 
 Wai Young b. 1960 first elected in 2011 as Conservative member for Vancouver South, British Columbia.

Yu 

 Charles Yuill b. 1889 first elected in 1953 as Social Credit member for Jasper—Edson, Alberta.
 David Yurdiga b. 1964 first elected in 2014 as Conservative member for Fort McMurray—Athabasca, Alberta. 
 William Yurko b. 1926 first elected in 1979 as Progressive Conservative member for Edmonton East, Alberta.

Y